Chu Mạnh Trinh (chữ Hán: 朱孟楨, 1862–1905), courtesy name as Cán Thần, and his art name as Trúc Vân, was a well-known intellectual in the Nguyễn dynasty. He was the author of the poem Hàm Tử quan hoài cổ and Hương Sơn Phong Cảnh Ca.

References

1862 births
1905 deaths
Vietnamese male poets
Nguyễn dynasty poets